Ketāb-e Dīārbakrīya is a book on the history of the Aq Qoyunlu and Qara Qoyunlu Turkmen dynasties in Persian. The book is considered the most important primary source on the history of these two dynasties. The author of the book is Abu Bakr Tehrani. The book was written between 875/1469 and 883/1478.

Author 
Abu Bakr Tehrani was a historian and official in the court of the Aq Qoyunlu and Qara Qoyunlu dynasties. The only information we have about him comes from his own autobiography in the book. He introduced himself as Abu Bakr al-Tehrani al-Esfahani.

Importance 
Ketāb-e Dīārbakrīya is the only independent primary source about the Aq Qoyunlu and Qara Qoyunlu Turkmen dynasties. Muhammad Khwandamir was aware of the existence of this book, though he did not use it in his works. According to Faruk Sümer, the unique manuscript of this book contains information about the year 876 AH and is incomplete.

References

Sources 
 
 

Kara Koyunlu
Persian-language books
1470s books
Books of the Aq Qoyunlu